The hair matrix, or simply matrix, produces the actual hair shaft as well as the inner and outer root sheaths of hair.

References

Hair anatomy